Austin Zachary Gomber (born November 23, 1993) is an American professional baseball pitcher for the Colorado Rockies of Major League Baseball (MLB). He has previously played in MLB for the St. Louis Cardinals. The Cardinals' fourth round selection of the 2014 MLB draft, Gomber attended Florida Atlantic University and played college baseball for the Owls.  The Cardinals named him one of their two 2015 Co-Minor League Pitchers of the Year. He made his MLB debut in 2018.  He bats and throws left-handed.

Baseball career

Amateur career
Austin Gomber attended West Orange High School in Winter Garden, Florida, and, after graduation, made himself available for the Major League Baseball (MLB) draft, but remained unselected.  He enrolled at Florida Atlantic University, where he played college baseball for the Florida Atlantic Owls.  There, he played three seasons, made 41 starts and registered a 3.27 earned run average (ERA) in  innings pitched (IP). In 2013, he played collegiate summer baseball with the Bourne Braves of the Cape Cod Baseball League.

St. Louis Cardinals
The St. Louis Cardinals selected Gomber in the fourth round of the 2014 MLB draft and signed him with a $374,100 bonus.  His first assignment was to the State College Spikes of the Class A-Short Season New York–Penn League, where he recorded a 2-2 record and 2.30 ERA with 36 strikeouts in 11 games started for State College.

In 2015, Gomber pitched for the Peoria Chiefs, where he was named a Midwest League All-Star.  He finished the season with a 15−3 record and a 2.67 ERA, leading the league in wins, strikeouts (140) and batting average against (.198).  At one point during the season, he won 13 consecutive decisions.  The Cardinals named Gomber their Minor League Pitcher of the Month for August 2015, and, along with Alex Reyes, their Co-Minor League Pitchers of the Year.  The Cardinals invited him to spring training as a non-roster player in 2016.

Gomber began 2016 with the Palm Beach Cardinals and was promoted to the Springfield Cardinals in July. In his second start for Springfield on July 30, 2016, he pitched seven innings against the Northwest Arkansas Naturals and allowed one hit, no runs, two walks and struck out three.  Gomber had started 19 games over Classes A-Advanced and AA to that point in 2016, allowing a 2.69 ERA and a 1.04 WHIP over  innings. He finished the 2016 season with a combined 7-8 record and a 2.69 ERA in 21 starts. After the season, the Cardinals assigned Gomber to the Glendale Desert Dogs of the Arizona Fall League (AFL). Gomber was one of the best pitchers in the AFL and finished the season with seven games started, a 5-1 record, and a 2.14 ERA.

Gomber spent 2017 with Springfield. After struggling during the first half of the season, Gomber posted a 1.92 ERA in his last ten games with Springfield. He finished the 2017 season 10-7 with a 3.34 ERA and 1.17 WHIP in 26 starts, as he pitched 143 innings (4th in the Texas League) and had 140 strikeouts (2nd) and gave up 61 walks (5th) and 17 home runs (6th). The Cardinals added him to their 40-man roster after the season to protect him from being chosen in the Rule 5 Draft.

Gomber began 2018 with the Memphis Redbirds. On April 23, 2018, in a game against the Iowa Cubs, Gomber tied the Redbirds' franchise record for strikeouts in a game with 16, joining Lance Lynn who also struck out 16 in 2010.

The Cardinals promoted Gomber from Memphis on April 29, 2018, to pitch in long relief out of the bullpen. However, he did not make an appearance and was optioned back to Memphis on May 4. He was recalled once again on May 31, and he made his major league debut on June 2, pitching three scoreless innings of relief against the Pittsburgh Pirates at Busch Stadium in a 3-2 walk-off win. He was optioned back to Memphis on July 6. He was recalled on July 24 to make his first major league start that night. In his first MLB start, Gomber threw six no-hit innings against the Cincinnati Reds before allowing a single to Joey Votto with one out in the seventh inning. He finished the year with St. Louis, compiling a 6-2 record with a 4.44 ERA and a 1.51 WHIP in 29 games (11 starts).

During the pandemic-shortened 2020 season, Gomber appeared in 10 games (four starts) with the Cardinals, going 1-1 with an ERA of 1.86. In 29 innings pitched, he struck out 27 batters while walking 15.

Colorado Rockies 
On February 1, 2021, Gomber was traded to the Colorado Rockies alongside minor league players Elehuris Montero, Mateo Gil, Tony Locey and Jake Sommers in exchange for Nolan Arenado. For the 2021 season, Gomber made 23 starts, tallying a 9–9 record with a 4.53 ERA and 113 strikeouts in  innings before his season was cut short due to a stress fracture in his lower back.

Pitching style
Gomber throws four pitches: a fastball, changeup, curveball, and a slider.  His fastball can reach .  In his pre-draft report, Jim Callis commented that his changeup was his best pitch.

Personal life
Gomber and his then fiancé, Rachel, had their first child, a son, in 2019. The couple married in December 2019 and had their second son in August 2021. His wife chronicles their life on TikTok.

References

External links

Living people
1993 births
People from Winter Garden, Florida
Baseball players from Florida
Major League Baseball pitchers
St. Louis Cardinals players
Colorado Rockies players
Florida Atlantic Owls baseball players
Bourne Braves players
State College Spikes players
Peoria Chiefs players
Palm Beach Cardinals players
Springfield Cardinals players
Memphis Redbirds players
Glendale Desert Dogs players